Naida Margaret Cole (born October 28, 1974 in Durham, North Carolina, U.S.) is a Canadian-American concert pianist who left a successful career as a recording artist and touring musician in 2007 to pursue medicine, studying at the Warren Alpert Medical School.

Early life
Cole was born in the USA, lived in Saudi Arabia and the United Kingdom as a child, and moved to Canada in 1984. She graduated from The Royal Conservatory of Music in Toronto at the age of 13, making her the second youngest to receive the school's ARCT degree (the youngest was Glenn Gould); at RCM she studied with Marina Geringas. She later studied piano at the Peabody Conservatory of Johns Hopkins University with the pianist and conductor Leon Fleisher, and flute with flutist Robert Willoughby. Other studies brought her to the Fondazione Internazionale per il pianoforte in Cadenabbia, Italy, and to the University of Montreal, where she earned her Masters in Music and studied with Marc Durand. Her decision to become a pianist was made while she attended the Chetham's School of Music.

Musical Career
She has recorded music by Fauré, Chabrier, Satie and Ravel. She has performed with the Toronto Symphony, the Montreal Symphony Orchestra and National Arts Centre Orchestras and also with Gidon Kremer's Kremerata Baltica, the London Sinfonietta and the Munich, Warsaw and Royal Liverpool Philharmonic Orchestras.

She is an exclusive Decca recording artist. Her first recording (of music by Fauré, Chabrier, Satie and Ravel) was released on Deutsche Grammophon, and was named one of the Critics’ Favourite CDs of 2001 by Gramophone Magazine. BBC Music Magazine awarded it five (out of five) stars. She has performed regularly  with Gidon Kremer and with his ensemble Kremerata Baltica, and appeared on their recording After Mozart.

Naida Cole is a Yamaha Artist.

Discography

Awards
 Tenth Van Cliburn International Piano Competition (1997)
 Phyllis Jones Tilley Memorial Award for Best Performance of Commissioned Work
 Steven De Groote Memorial Award for Best Performance of Chamber Music
 Semifinalist
 Juno Award (2000): Nominee, Best Classical Album (Solo or Chamber Ensemble)

Medical Career and Personal life
Cole obtained her MD from the Warren Alpert Medical School of Brown University. She completed an internship at Cambridge Health Alliance (Massachusetts), and then her residency in anesthesiology at Massachusetts General Hospital. Cole is currently an Assistant Professor in the Department of Anesthesia and Critical Care at the University of Chicago.   

She is married to a marine biologist, and lives in Hyde Park, Illinois.

References

External links
 Official website
 iClassics interview

Canadian classical pianists
Canadian women pianists
American classical pianists
American women classical pianists
1974 births
Living people
American expatriate musicians in Canada
Musicians from North Carolina
The Royal Conservatory of Music alumni
Alpert Medical School alumni
21st-century American women pianists
21st-century classical pianists
Physicians of Brigham and Women's Hospital
American anesthesiologists
21st-century American pianists
Women anesthesiologists